Taiyafeh-ye Babakhan (also Romanized as Ţāīyafeh-ye Bābākhān) is a village in Howmeh-ye Jonubi Rural District, in the Central District of Eslamabad-e Gharb County, Kermanshah Province, Iran. At the 2006 census, its population was 30, in 7 families.

References 

Populated places in Eslamabad-e Gharb County